Louise Gerrish (born 1948 in Livonia, Michigan) is a former nationally renowned track and field athlete.

During the mid-1960s, Gerrish was a high school All-American and one of the best javelin throwers in the United States; even though the javelin throw is not an official Michigan High School Athletic Association event.

As a Livonia-Franklin High School sophomore, Gerrish finished third at the 1964 USA Amateur Athletic Union national championships; she reprised her bronze medal performance at the 1966 AAU finals. The following year, Gerrish placed third at the Pan-American Games Trials; she also recorded a lifetime-best throw of 54.50 meters, to rank 11th worldwide in 1967.

Joined by Olympians Francie Kraker and Micki King, Gerrish was one of several sportswomen who represented the Michigammes Athletic Club of Ann Arbor, Michigan.

References

1948 births
Living people
American female javelin throwers
Sportspeople from Livonia, Michigan
21st-century American women